Troed may refer to the following places in Wales:

Troed y Rhiw, hamlet in Ceredigion
Troed-y-rhiw, village in Merthyr Tydfil
Troed-y-rhiw-Sion, hamlet in the community of Beulah, Ceredigion
Troed-yr-hen-riw, hamlet in the community of Blaenrheidol, Ceredigion